The Bantam River is a two-part, southward-flowing stream located in northwest Connecticut in the United States. The full river comprises two streams that flow into and out of Bantam Lake and that are referred to as Bantam Lake Inlet and Bantam Lake Outlet. The river rises in the marsh area north of the Litchfield Reservoir and empties into the Shepaug River. It forms the southern boundary of Mount Tom State Park.

References

Rivers of Connecticut
Rivers of Litchfield County, Connecticut
Goshen, Connecticut
Litchfield
Morris, Connecticut